Vista Alegre is a station of Line 5 of the Madrid Metro. It is located in fare Zone A.

References

Line 5 (Madrid Metro) stations
Railway stations in Spain opened in 1968